Stan Cox was an Australian rules footballer for the West Torrens Football Club during the 1940s.  On one occasion following a heavy kick to the jaw, a semi-conscious and dazed Cox made the news for tackling teammate Ray Roberts.

External links

References

West Torrens Football Club players
Australian rules footballers from South Australia